The Best Movie 2 is a 2009 Russian comedy from  Monumental Pictures (Sony Pictures Entertainment) and Comedy Club Production, continuation of 2008 The Best Movie film, spoofing such famous Russian films as Zhara, The Irony of Fate 2 and TV-programs: Malakhov+, King of Ring and Taxi.

Plot

Cast
 Garik Kharlamov as Landsman
 Mikhail Galustyan as Catherine II
 Evgeniy Vereschagin as Majore
 Timur Batrudinov as Actor
 Dmitry Khrustalyov as Dimaty
 Dmitry Nagiev as Gennady Malakhov
 Sergey Lazarev as himself

References

External links
 

2009 films
2000s Russian-language films
2000s parody films
Russian sequel films
Russian comedy films
Russian parody films
2009 comedy films